The United States Senate election of 1934 in New Jersey was held on November 6, 1934. 

Incumbent Republican Senator Hamilton Fish Kean ran for re-election to a second term in office, but was defeated by Governor of New Jersey A. Harry Moore in a landslide. 

This was among the nine seats Democrats gained in this year's elections. 

This election also marks the end of a streak of four straight elections in which the incumbents were defeated, beginning in 1916.

Republican primary

Candidates
James Blauvelt, former Assemblyman from Ridgewood
Hamilton Fish Kean, incumbent Senator since 1929

Campaign
Senator Kean was challenged by former Assemblyman James Blauvelt, who opposed what he called Kean's "Wall Street viewpoint." The opposition came as a surprise to the Senator and most Republicans. He ran on a ticket named "Public Ownership; Against Wall St. Domination."

Results

Democratic primary

Candidates
A. Harry Moore, Governor of New Jersey

Results
Governor Moore was unopposed for the Democratic nomination.

General election

Candidates
John C. Butterworth (Socialist Labor)
William L. Detmering (Independent Voters)
Rebecca Grecht (Communist)
Elwood Hollingsworth (Prohibition)
Hamilton Fish Kean (Republican), incumbent Senator
John S. Martin (Socialist)
A. Harry Moore (Democratic), Governor of New Jersey

Results

See also 
1934 United States Senate elections

References

New Jersey
1934
1934 New Jersey elections